Chris Evert and Wendy Turnbull were the defending champions but did not compete that year.

Terry Phelps and Raffaella Reggi won in the final 6–2, 6–4 against Cammy MacGregor and Cynthia MacGregor.

Seeds
Champion seeds are indicated in bold text while text in italics indicates the round in which those seeds were eliminated.

 Rosalyn Fairbank /  Eva Pfaff (semifinals)
 Mary Lou Daniels /  Kathleen Horvath (quarterfinals)
 Katrina Adams /  Penny Barg (semifinals)
 Cammy MacGregor /  Cynthia MacGregor (final)

Draw

References
 1988 Eckerd Open Doubles Draw

1988 WTA Tour